Surplus labour (German: Mehrarbeit) is a concept used by Karl Marx in his critique of political economy. It means labour performed in excess of the labour necessary to produce the means of livelihood of the worker ("necessary labour"). The "surplus" in this context means the additional labour a worker has to do in their job, beyond earning their keep. According to Marxian economics, surplus labour is usually uncompensated (unpaid) labour.

Origin

Marx explains the origin of surplus labour in the following terms:

The historical emergence of surplus labour is, according to Marx, also closely associated with the growth of trade (the economic exchange of goods and services) and with the emergence of a society divided into social classes. As soon as a permanent surplus product can be produced, the moral-political question arises as to how it should be distributed, and for whose benefit surplus-labour should be performed. The strong defeat the weak, and it becomes possible for a social elite to gain control over the surplus-labour and surplus product of the working population; they can live off the labour of others.

Labour which is sufficiently productive so that it can perform surplus labour is, in a cash economy, the material foundation for the appropriation of surplus-value from that labour. How exactly this appropriation will occur, is determined by the prevailing relations of production and the balance of power between social classes. 

According to Marx, capital had its origin in the commercial activity of buying in order to sell and rents of various types, with the aim of gaining an income (a surplus value) from this trade. But, initially, this does not involve any capitalist mode of production; rather, the merchant traders and rentiers are intermediaries between non-capitalist producers. During a lengthy historical process, the old ways of extracting surplus labour are gradually replaced by commercial forms of exploitation.

Historical materialism

In Das Kapital Vol. 3, Marx highlights the central role played by surplus labour:

This statement is a foundation of Marx's historical materialism insofar as it specifies what the class conflicts in civil society are ultimately about: an economy of time, which compels some to do work of which part or all of the benefits go to someone else, while others can have leisure-time which in reality depends on the work efforts of those forced to work. 

In modern society, having work or leisure may often seem a choice, but for most of humanity, work is an absolute necessity, and consequently most people are concerned with the real benefits they get from that work. They may accept a certain rate of exploitation of their labour as an inescapable condition for their existence, if they depend on a wage or salary, but beyond that, they will increasingly resist it. Consequently, a morality or legal norm develops in civil society which imposes limits for surplus-labour, in one form or another. Forced labour, slavery, gross mistreatment of workers etc. are no longer generally acceptable, although they continue to occur; working conditions and pay levels can usually be contested in courts of law.

Unequal exchange

Marx acknowledged that surplus labour may not just be appropriated directly in production by the owners of the enterprise, but also in trade. This phenomenon is nowadays called unequal exchange. Thus, he commented that:

In this case, more work effectively exchanges for less work, and a greater value exchanges for a lesser value, because some possess a stronger market position, and others a weaker one. For the most part, Marx assumed equal exchange in Das Kapital, i.e. that supply and demand would balance; his argument was that even if, ideally speaking, no unequal exchange occurred in trade, and market equality existed, exploitation could nevertheless occur within capitalist relations of production, since the value of the product produced by labour power exceeded the value of labour power itself. Marx never completed his analysis of the world market however. 

In the real world, Marxian economists like Samir Amin argue, unequal exchange occurs all the time, implying transfers of value from one place to another, through the trading process. Thus, the more trade becomes "globalised", the greater the intermediation between producers and consumers; consequently, the intermediaries appropriate a growing fraction of the final value of the products, while the direct producers obtain only a small fraction of that final value. 

The most important unequal exchange in the world economy nowadays concerns the exchange between agricultural goods and industrial goods, i.e. the terms of trade favour industrial goods against agricultural goods. Often, as Raul Prebisch already noted, this has meant that more and more agricultural output must be produced and sold, to buy a given amount of industrial goods. This issue has become the subject of heated controversy at recent WTO meetings.

The practice of unequal or unfair exchange does not presuppose the capitalist mode of production, nor even the existence of money. It only presupposes that goods and services of unequal value are traded, something which has been possible throughout the whole history of human trading practices.

Criticism of Marx's concept of surplus labour
According to economist Fred Moseley, "neoclassical economic theory was developed, in part, to attack the very notion of surplus labour or surplus value and to argue that workers receive all of the value embodied in their creative efforts."

Some basic modern criticisms of Marx's theory can be found in the works by Pearson, Dalton, Boss, Hodgson and Harris (see references).

The analytical Marxist John Roemer challenges what he calls the "fundamental Marxian theorem" (after Michio Morishima) that the existence of surplus labour is the necessary and sufficient condition for profits. He proves that this theorem is logically false. However, Marx himself never argued that surplus labour was a sufficient condition for profits, only an ultimate necessary condition (Morishima aimed to prove that, starting from the existence of profit expressed in price terms, we can deduce the existence of surplus value as a logical consequence). Five reasons were that: 

profit in a capitalist operation was "ultimately" just a financial claim to products and labour services made by those who did not themselves produce those products and services, in virtue of their ownership of private property (capital assets).
profits could be made purely in trading processes, which themselves could be far removed in space and time from the co-operative labour which those profits ultimately presupposed.
surplus labour could be performed, without this leading to any profits at all, because e.g. the products of that labour failed to be sold.
profits could be made without any labour being involved, such as when a piece of unimproved land is sold for a profit.
profits could be made by a self-employed operator who did not perform surplus labour for somebody else, nor necessarily appropriated surplus labour from anywhere else.

All that Marx really argued was that surplus labour was a necessary feature of the capitalist mode of production as a general social condition. If that surplus labour did not exist, other people could not appropriate that surplus labour or its products simply through their ownership of property.

Also, the amount of unpaid, voluntary and housework labour performed outside the world of business and industry, as revealed by time use surveys, suggests to some feminists (e.g. Marilyn Waring and Maria Mies) that Marxists may have overrated the importance of industrial surplus labour performed by salaried employees, because the very ability to perform that surplus-labour, i.e. the continual reproduction of labour power depends on all kinds of supports involving unremunerated work (for a theoretical discussion, see the reader by Bonnie Fox). In other words, work performed in households—often by those who do not sell their labour power to capitalist enterprises at all—contributes to the sustenance of capitalist workers who may perform little household labour.

Possibly the controversy about the concept is distorted by the enormous differences with regard to the world of work: 

in Europe, the United States, Japan and Australasia,
the newly industrialising countries, and
the poor countries.

Countries differ greatly with respect to the way they organise and share out work, labour participation rates, and paid hours worked per year, as can be easily verified from ILO data (see also Rubery & Grimshaw's text). The general trend in the world division of labour is for hi-tech, financial and marketing services to be located in the richer countries, which hold most intellectual property rights and actual physical production to be located in low-wage countries. Effectively, Marxian economists argue, this means that the labour of workers in wealthy countries is valued higher than the labour of workers in poorer countries. However, they predict that in the long run of history, the operation of the law of value will tend to equalize the conditions of production and sales in different parts of the world.

See also
Abstract labour and concrete labour
Capital accumulation
Capitalist mode of production
Economic surplus
Labour power
Labour theory of value
Productive and unproductive labour
Reserve army of labour
Spatial mismatch
Surplus product
Surplus value

Notes

References
Capital, Volume I
The Agrarian Question in Russia Towards the Close of the Nineteenth Century
Capital, Volume III
Karl Marx, "The character of surplus labour" 
George Dalton (February 1961). "Economic theory and primitive society". American Anthropologist, LXIII, no. 1, 1–25.

Marvin Harris, Cultural Materialism: The Struggle for a Science of Culture. Random House 1979.
Geoffrey Hodgson, Capitalism, Value and Exploitation (Martin Robertson, Oxford, 1982).
Ernest Mandel, Marxist Economic Theory, Vol. 1. London: Merlin Press, 1968.
Karl Marx, Das Kapital.
Bonnie Fox (ed.), Hidden in the Household: Women's Domestic Labour Under Capitalism, Women's Press, 1980.
Stephen A. Resnick and Richard D. Wolff, Knowledge and Class: A Marxian Critique of Political Economy (University of Chicago Press, Chicago, 1987).
Jill Rubery and Damian Grimshaw, The Organization of Employment; An International Perspective. Palgrave Macmillan, 2003.
Fred Moseley papers 
Harry W. Pearson, "The economy has no surplus" in "Trade and market in the early empires. Economies in history and theory", edited by Karl Polanyi, Conrad M. Arensberg and Harry W. Pearson (New York/London: The Free Press: Collier-Macmillan, 1957).
John Roemer, Analytical foundations of Marxian Economic Theory. Cambridge University Press, 1981.

Labour economics
Marxian economics